Benjamin Bonzi was the defending champion but chose not to defend his title.

Hugo Grenier won the title after defeating Constant Lestienne 7–5, 6–3 in the final.

Seeds

Draw

Finals

Top half

Bottom half

References

External links
Main draw
Qualifying draw

Open Castilla y León - 1
2022 Singles